Conditionality may refer to:

 Conditionality, in political economy and international relations
 Conditionality (Buddhism), also known as Pratitya-samutpada
 Conditionality principle in statistical inference
 Instrumental conditionality of objects in philosophy and ethics